Scars of Love is a 1918 Australian silent film. It is a lost film about which little is known except it is a melodrama featuring a Red Cross nurse and an Anzac soldier which climaxes in the European battlefields of World War I in which both leads die. It deals with the sins of the father visiting the children.

Production
The film was most likely made by wealthy amateur enthusiasts. It was shot in Melbourne.

It was re-released in 1919 as Should Children Suffer.

References

External links

Scars of Love at National Film and Sound Archive

1918 films
Australian drama films
Australian black-and-white films
Australian silent feature films
Lost Australian films
1918 drama films
1918 lost films
Lost drama films
Silent drama films